The 2008–09 All-Ireland Senior Club Hurling Championship was the 39th since the establishment of the competition by the Gaelic Athletic Association in 1970–71. The first matches of the season were played on 12 October 2008 and the championship ended on 17 March 2009. Portumna went into the 2008 championship as defending champions, having won their second All-Ireland title the previous year.

The championship culminated with the All-Ireland final, held at Croke Park, Dublin. The match was contested by Portumna and De La Salle. It was their first meeting in the final. Portumna won the game by 2–24 to 1–8. It was their second All-Ireland title in succession and an unprecedented third in four years.

Format

The 2008–09 club championship was played on a straight knock-out basis. Each of the sixteen participating counties enter their respective club champions. The format of the competition was as follows:

Sixteen county club champions participated in the 2008–09 championship. These counties were as follows:
 Leinster: Dublin, Kilkenny, Laois, Offaly, Westmeath, Wexford.
 Munster: Clare, Cork, Limerick, Tipperary, Waterford.
 Connacht: Galway.
 Ulster: Antrim, Armagh, Derry, Down.

Provincial Championships

The Leinster, Munster and Ulster championships were played as usual on a straight knock-out basis. The three respective champions from these provinces advanced directly to the All-Ireland semi-finals.

All-Ireland Series

Semi-finals: (2 matches) The Munster champions played the Ulster champions while the Leinster champions played the champions of Galway.  The Galway club champions enter the competition at this stage due to the absence of a provincial club championship in Connacht.

Participating clubs

Fixtures

Ulster Senior Club Hurling Championship

Leinster Senior Club Hurling Championship

Munster Senior Club Hurling Championship

All-Ireland Senior Club Hurling Championship

Match Rules
60 minutes
Replay if scores level
Maximum of 5 substitutions

Championship statistics

Scoring

Widest winning margin: 26 points
Portumna 2–24 : 1–8 De La Salle (All-Ireland final)
Most goals in a match: 6
Portumna 5–11 : 1–16 Ballyhale Shamrocks (All-Ireland semi-final)
Most points in a match: 40
De La Salle 1–21 : 1–19 Ruairí Óg, Cushendall (All-Ireland semi-final)
Most goals by one team in a match: 5
Portumna 5–11 : 1–16 Ballyhale Shamrocks (All-Ireland semi-final)
Most points by one team in a match: 26
Ballyhale Shamrocks 0–26 : 0–9 Raharney (Leinster semi-final)
Sarsfield's 0–26 : 0–10 Clonlara (Munster quarter-final)

Top scorers

Season

Single game

Referees
The following referees were used during the championship:

Stadia
The following stadia were used during the championship:

2008 in hurling
2009 in hurling
All-Ireland Senior Club Hurling Championship